Icaricia icarioides, or Boisduval's blue, is a butterfly of the family Lycaenidae found in North America. This butterfly has 25 recognized subspecies.

This species has been classified in at least four different genera since it was named by Jean Baptiste Boisduval in 1852. It started out in Lycaena, was transferred to Icaricia by Nabokov (Hodges et al., 1983), moved to Aricia by Bálint and Johnson (1997), merged with some other genera in the supergenus Plebejus by Gorbunov (2001), which was accepted by Opler & Warren (2003) and Pelham's Catalogue (as of 2012); however, Lamas (2004) among others use Aricia. More recently, it was moved back to the genus Icaricia, which was reinstated as a result of molecular studies (Vila et al., 2011; Talavera et al., 2013). Synonymy, subgenera, and subspecies vary considerably depending on the author.

Their range extends throughout the western US and Canada from southern Saskatchewan to British Columbia. Its habitats include dunes, mountains, meadows, streams, and sage-lands. It is also found in open areas or openings in woods near its larval host.

Larvae feed on species of lupines (Lupinus). Adults feed on nectar from flowers of Eriogonum species and other composites.

Wingspan: 21 to 32 mm.

Similar species
Greenish blue (Icaricia saepiolus)
Silvery blue (Glaucopsyche lygdamus)

Subspecies
Icaricia icarioides albihalos
Icaricia icarioides argusmontana
Icaricia icarioides atascadero
Icaricia icarioides austinorum
Icaricia icarioides blackmorei - Puget blue
Icaricia icarioides buchholzi
Icaricia icarioides eosierra
Icaricia icarioides evius
Icaricia icarioides fenderi – Fender's blue
Icaricia icarioides fulla
Icaricia icarioides helios
Icaricia icarioides icarioides
Icaricia icarioides inyo
Icaricia icarioides lycea
Icaricia icarioides missionensis – Mission blue
Icaricia icarioides montis
Icaricia icarioides moroensis
Icaricia icarioides nigrafem
Icaricia icarioides panamintina
Icaricia icarioides parapheres
Icaricia icarioides pardalis
Icaricia icarioides pembina
Icaricia icarioides pheres (extinct)
Icaricia icarioides sacre
Icaricia icarioides santana

References

Icaricia
Butterflies of North America
Fauna of the Western United States
Butterflies described in 1852
Taxa named by Jean Baptiste Boisduval